Ramarama may refer to:
 Ramarama, New Zealand, a community in the Auckland region of New Zealand
 Lophomyrtus bullata, also known as ramarama, a plant native to New Zealand
 Ramarama language, a language of Brazil

See also 
 Rama rama, a species of fish
 Rama Rama, part of the Hare Krishna mantra